Tau Cassiopeiae (τ Cassiopeiae) is a solitary, orange hued star in the northern constellation of Cassiopeia. It is bright enough to be seen with the naked eye, having an apparent visual magnitude of +4.86. Based upon an annual parallax shift of 18.75 mas as seen from Earth, this system is located about 174 light years from the Sun.

The spectrum of this star indicates it is an evolved, K-type giant star with a stellar classification of K1 IIIa. It is a suspected variable star of unknown type. Tau Cassiopeiae is 3.9 billion years old with about 1.44 times the mass of the Sun and 10 times the Sun's radius. It is radiating 40 times the Sun's luminosity from its expanded photosphere at an effective temperature of around 4,617 K.

Naming

References

K-type giants
Suspected variables
Cassiopeiae, Tau
Cassiopeia (constellation)
Durchmusterung objects
Cassiopeiae, 05
223165
117301
9008